Trachyaretaon echinatus is a species of the order of the stick insects native to various Philippine islands.

Characteristics 
The lively green-brown to black-brown and very variable coloring can be dominated by dark green tones in the females. In addition to black areas on the front segments of the abdomen, they can also have white bands on the femurs or a white triangle on the pronotum. They are morphologically similar to those of the slightly smaller Trachyaretaon gatla, in which the supraanal plate (epiproct), i.e. the eleventh tergite, as well as the seventh sternite of the abdomen is clearly notched, while in the females of Trachyaretaon echinatus it ends rounded or truncated. The abdominal tergites two to seven are almost twice as wide as long, the tergites six to nine are smooth or indistinctly keeled, unlike in Trachyaretaon gatla. Compared to the significantly larger and less spined Trachyaretaon carmelae, the tiny spines between the large teeth on the ventral carina of the meso- and metafemurs are missing in both sexes.

Distribution and Way of life 
While only the Philippines are mentioned as the original locality, subsequent works specify this and name the islands of Sibuyan, Masbate and Luzon as the distribution area. Manila, Banahao and Marinfata are mentioned as localities on Luzon. Mango and guava are known to be food plants for Trachyaretaon echinatus. Since both crops are in the range of the species, it is sometimes considered a pest species there.

Taxonomy 
The species name "echinatus" refers to the prickly body surface (ancient Greek echínos (ἐχῖνος) for Sea urchins (Echinoidea)). In 1939 James Abram Garfield Rehn and his son John W. H. Rehn described the genus Aretaon with the subgenera Aretaon and Trachyaretaon. In the subgenus Trachyaretaon she transferred as the only species Obrimus echinatus, which was thus referred to as Aretaon (Trachyaretaon) echinatus. In 2004, Oliver Zompro elevated this subgenus to the rank of a genus, the type species of which is Trachyaretaon echinatus.

In terraristics 
Since around 2010/2011, a sexual breeding stock has been found in the terrariums of lovers, which goes back to specimens collected in 2009 by Joachim Bresseel on Luzon in the province of Aurora near the city of San Luis at the Cunayan and Ditumabo waterfalls. It was first referred to as Trachyaretaon echinatus, but was not considered to belong to this species shortly after breeding was established. Since then, this stock is known under the name Trachyaretaon sp. 'Aurora'. The Phasmid Study Group lists it under the PSG number 317. Shortly after the introduction of Trachyaretaon sp. 'Aurora' the first specimens actually identified as Trachyaretaon echinatus came alive to Europe. The stock, which is also sexual, goes back to animals collected in Marinfata on Luzon. In contrast to Trachyaretaon sp. 'Aurora' this species got the PSG number 326 from the Phasmid Study Group.

Keeping and breeding is considered easy. A wide variety of forage plants such as bramble, hazel, firethorn and ivy are eaten. Moderately moist terrariums with substrate for laying eggs are required for breeding.

References

External links

Phasmatodea
Phasmatodea of Asia
Insects described in 1877